B EP is a 2004 EP by the American math rock band Battles. It was part of a trio of EPs released by Battles over the course of three months, and has been called "another sketchbook revealing where the group could end up in the future."

B EP was released on Warp Records.

Track listing

Personnel
 Dave Konopka – Bass, Guitar, Effects
 John Stanier – Drums
 Ian Williams – Guitar, Keyboards
 Tyondai Braxton – Guitar, Keyboards, Vocals

References

2004 EPs
Battles (band) EPs